Étampes is a commune in the metropolitan area of Paris, France.

Étampes, together with the neighboring communes of Morigny-Champigny and Brières-les-Scellés, form an urban area of 30,881 inhabitants (2018). This urban area is a "satellite city" of Paris.

History
Étampes existed at the beginning of the 7th century and in the early Middle Ages belonged to the crown domain. During the Middle Ages it was the scene of several councils, the most notable of which took place in 1130 and resulted in the recognition of Innocent II as the legitimate pope. In 1652, during the war of the Fronde it suffered severely at the hands of the royal troops under Turenne.

Geography
Étampes lies on the river Chalouette, a tributary of the Juine, which borders the eastern outskirts of the serene town.

Inhabitants of Étampes are known as Étampois.

Transport
Étampes is served by two stations on Paris RER line C: Étampes and Saint-Martin-d'Étampes. Étampes station is also served by regional trains to Orléans and Paris.

Population

Sights
A fine view of Étampes is obtained from the Tour Guinette, a keep (now ruined) built by Louis VI in the 12th century on an eminence on the other side of the railway. Notre-Dame du Fort, the chief church, dates from the 11th and 12th centuries; irregular in plan, it is remarkable for a fine Romanesque tower and spire, and for the crenellated wall which partly surrounds it. The interior contains ancient paintings and other artistic works. St Basile (12th and 16th centuries), preserves a Romanesque doorway, and St Martin (12th and 13th centuries), has a leaning tower of the 16th century.

The civil buildings offer little interest, but two houses named after Anne de Pisseleu, mistress of Francis I, and Diane de Poitiers, mistress of Henry II, are graceful examples of Renaissance architecture. In the square there is a statue of the naturalist, Étienne Geoffroy Saint-Hilaire, who was born in Étampes.

Monuments and tourist attractions

 Hôtel Anne de Pisseleu
 Théâtre built by the architect Gabriel Davioud in 1851-1852, paid for by a public subscription
 Regional leisure park (wave pool)
 Sculptures created by André Deluol: Vénus anadyomène, La Terre, Le Corbeau et le Renard, Jeune fille et oiseau, Un Ange, Deux danseuses nues
 The "Pergola de la Douce France" is located in the gardens of the Tour Guinette in Étampes and was part of a larger composition created in 1925 for the Exposition des Arts décoratifs et industriels.  It was acquired by Étampes in 1934.  The work comprises four large stone blocks on which sixteen bas-reliefs have been created by various sculptors. Georges Saupique executed the reliefs  "Le Saint Graal" and  "L'Aurochs".

Religious edifices
 Église Notre Dame du Fort

 Église Saint-Basile

 Église Saint-Martin, famous for its leaning tour

 Église Saint-Gilles

 Chapelle de Gérofosse
 Chapelle de Guinette

Notable Persons  
 Louise Abbéma (1853–1927), painter, sculptor, and designer
 Jean-Marc Fessard (born 1969), classical clarinetist
 Theobald of Étampes
 Jean-Victor Makengo, footballer
 Yacouba Sylla, footballer
 Bilal Ouali, footballer
 Michel Crépu (born 1954), writer and literary critic, winner of the 2012 Prix des Deux Magots
 Arnaud Beltrame, gendarme killed in the Carcassonne and Trèbes attack, 23 March 2018

Miscellaneous
The prestigious École Philippe Gaulier is located in Étampes.

See also
Communes of the Essonne department
Counts and Dukes of Étampes
Georges Saupique

References

External links

 Étampes city council website

Land use (IAURIF) 
 La Base des Loisirs, The city's park's website
Mayors of Essonne Association 

Communes of Essonne
Subprefectures in France
Orléanais